Acetylindoxyl oxidase is an enzyme that catalyzes the chemical reaction

N-acetylindoxyl + O2  N-acetylisatin + (?)

Thus, the two substrates of this enzyme are N-acetylindoxyl and oxygen, whereas its product is N-acetylisatin.

This enzyme belongs to the family of oxidoreductases, specifically those acting on other nitrogenous compounds as donors with oxygen as acceptor.  The systematic name of this enzyme class is N-acetylindoxyl:oxygen oxidoreductase. This enzyme participates in tryptophan metabolism.

References

 

EC 1.7.3
Enzymes of unknown structure